David Stern was born on February 3, 1956, in Essen, Germany and lives in New York City. Stern has referred to himself as an “action painter,” echoing the artistic legacies of New York School painters Jackson Pollock, Willem de Kooning and Franz Kline.  Yet his human forms reach further back to histories of portraiture.

After an apprenticeship as a sign painter Stern attended the Dortmund Fachhochschule für Design and Art (1975–79) and the Kunstakademie Düsseldorf (1980–82). He then taught painting at the Dortmund Fachhochschule für Design and Art, while he developed his painting skills living in a village near the town of Münster. In 1986 he moved to Cologne, where he found his artistic voice. From 1987 on, Stern exhibited his work nationally and quickly entered the international scene in the early nineties, with shows in Austria, Hungary, the Netherlands, Belgium and Great Britain. Stern's 1992 retrospective exhibition David Stern: Study for a Way at the Hungarian National Gallery in Budapest was the first exhibition by a contemporary Western artist after Hungary opened to the West.

In 1993, Stern showed his work in the US for the first time, immigrated in 1994 and became naturalized in 2000.
Since his arrival, he has been fascinated by his encounters with an intensely urban place defined by its energy, crowding, speed and cosmopolitism. His national traveling exhibition David Stern: The American Years (1995–2008) curated by Karen Wilkin, demonstrates shifts in form and content in Stern’s work since the artist moved to New York from Germany in 1995.

Stern has exhibited widely in New York City, the US and Europe.
His work can be found in public and private collections in the United States, Europe and Asia, including the Metropolitan Museum of Art (New York), the Kupferstichkabinett Dresden (Dresden, Germany), the National Museum (Poznan, Poland), Dresdner Bank (Cologne, Germany), the Kunstsammlung der Universität Göttingen (Göttingen, Germany), the Arkansas Art Center (Little Rock), the Museum of Contemporary Art Jacksonville (Jacksonville, Florida), the John and Mable Ringling Museum of Art (Sarasota, Florida), and the National September 11 Memorial & Museum (New York).

September 11, 2001 

Stern's paintings The Gatherings are powerful monuments of collective mourning after the events of September 11, 2001. The paintings are in the collection of the National September 11 Memorial & Museum in New York.

Portraits 

Throughout his career David Stern has created portraits - always self-portraits and portraits of those close to him - and always in the same close to life size - based on drawings that the model sits for. In addition to portraits of family members, he painted portraits of friends like the philosophers Günther Anders (1986/90) and Abraham Ehrlich (1990), the saxophonist Matze Schubert (1988), the artists Emil B. Hartwig (1990), Al Hansen (1993), Marvin Hayes and Frank Bara (2001/02) and William Wegman (2008), the football player Willis Crenshaw, the diplomats Berel Rodal (2002/03) and Ronald Fagan (1999), the author, screenwriter and poet Jeremy Larner (1999) the actress and therapist Doe Lang (2011/12), or the art critic and curator Karen Wilkin (1999).

Digital Drawings 

Stern has been involved with digital drawings since the first drawing apps for the iPhone came on the market. His thoughts about the nature and practice of digital drawings were published in 2013.
In the same year, Stern published the artist book “heros and graces,” 21 years after he published “the erotic nature of truth” with the philosopher Abraham Ehrlich (among others in the collection of The Metropolitan Museum of Art). It is a meditation on gender and based on a number of touch screen drawings.

Notes

References 

 David Stern, “In the Beginning was a Drawing… (Thoughts on Drawing and Binary Code)” and Chapter 14: “Black and White Magic by David Stern, New York, USA” in David Scott Leibowitz, Mobile Digital Art. Using the iPad and iPhone as Creative Tools, 2013, 
 David Stern, heroes and graces, New York 2013 http://www.blurb.com/b/4234682-david-stern-heros-and-graces 
 Thomas Ketelsen, “Skypieces or ‘Epiphanien des Zufalls’. David Sterns New Yorker Skizzenbuch im Dresdner Kupferstich-Kabinett, in Nina C. Illgen, Martin Roth: Dresden – New York: zu Ehren des 90. Geburtstages von Henry H. Arnhold. Dt. Kunstverlag, Berlin/Munich 2011* Karen Wilkin and Lance Esplund in David Stern: The American Years (1995–2008), New York: Yeshiva University Museum (2008/2009); Tulsa, OK: Alexandre Hogue Gallery(2008); Phoenix, AZ: Phoenix College (2010); Charleston, SC: William Halsey Institute of Contemporary Art (2010), 
 Teel Sale and Claudia Betti, Drawing. A Contemporary Approach, 6th edition, Belmont, CA 2008, p. 34, no. 2.12, 
 Lonnie Pierson Dunbier (Editor), The Artists Bluebook. 34,000 North American Artists. 16th Century to March 2005, Scottsdale (Arizona), 2005, p. 479
 Karen Wilkin and Mitchell Cohen in David Stern: Recent Paintings, New York: Rosenberg + Kaufman Fine Art 1999
 Marc Scheps and Ori Z. Soltes in David Stern: Identity and Relationship, Washington, DC: National Jewish Museum 1994
 Justus Bierich and Cornel Wachter (Hrsg.), David Stern: Studie für einen Weg/Tanulmany egy utrol/Study for a way 1987-1992, Budapest: Hungarian National Gallery 1992, mit Beiträgen von Lorand Bereczky, Werner Schmalenbach, Karl Arndt, Avraham Ehrlich und Jürgen Kisters, Kunstverlag Wolfrum Wien 1992
 Karl Arndt and Gudrun Meyer, David Stern: Malerei, Göttingen: Kunstsammlung der Universität Göttingen 1992

External links 

 "The Flux of Experience" - feature by the Fred Helm Film Group about the New York artist David Stern, filmed 2006 at David Stern Studio and the project 1740 space at the Starrett Lehigh Building in New York City, narrated by Tsvi Blanchard: http://video.yahoo.com/watch/4855123/12945815
 David Stern Studio: http://www.davidstern.us
 A conversation: Karen Wilkin talks with David Stern at the New York Studio School in January 2007: http://video.google.com/videoplay?docid=-252275628449895489
 A panel discussion: Figuration, Abstraction and the Spiritual on November 18, 2008, at the Yeshiva University Museum, New York. Moderator: Karen Wilkin, Panelists: Lance Esplund, Jill Nathanson, Archie Rand and David Stern: https://web.archive.org/web/20110604163002/http://video.google.com/videoplay?docid=3276628304264387136&q=source:005743370824443630880&hl=en
 Rich Fisher of Studio Tulsa talks with painter David Stern on KWGS, 89.5 NPR on October 29, 2008, about his National Travel Exhibition "The American Years": http://video.google.com/videoplay?docid=4923056936159719581&hl=en
 Blake Eskin, “A Passion for Impasto,” ARTnews Summer 2002, pp. 122–124: http://www.davidstern.us/blakeeskinArtNews2002.html
 Lance Esplund, "David Stern at Rosenberg & Kaufman", Art in America, June 2000, pp. 124–25: http://www.encyclopedia.com/doc/1G1-62685239.html
 Charles Ruas, “up now: David Stern at YU Museum”, ARTnews, January 2009, p. 112: http://www.davidstern.us/ARTnews2009review.html
 Monica Strauss, “David Stern. Rituelle Gesten,” Aufbau, September 2007, p. 10: http://www.davidstern.us/Aufbau07.jpg
 David Grosz, "Human Figures, Broken and Restored, In the Work of one Artist," Forward, March 19, 2004, p. 11: http://www.davidstern.us/articleDavidGrosz.html

German emigrants to the United States
20th-century German painters
20th-century American male artists
German male painters
21st-century German painters
1956 births
German portrait painters
Living people
20th-century American painters
American male painters
21st-century American painters
21st-century American male artists
Kunstakademie Düsseldorf alumni
20th-century American printmakers
20th-century German printmakers